"Roni" is a song by American singer Bobby Brown, written by Kenneth "Babyface" Edmonds with additional lyrics written by the Deele member Darnell Bristol. It was released as a single in 1988 on the MCA label as the third single from Brown's second album, Don't Be Cruel (1988). "Roni" reached number three on the US Billboard Hot 100 chart in March 1989 and peaked at number two on the Hot Black Singles chart in January 1989.

Charts

Weekly charts

Year-end charts

References

1988 singles
1988 songs
Bobby Brown songs
MCA Records singles
New jack swing songs
Song recordings produced by L.A. Reid
Song recordings produced by Babyface (musician)
Songs written by Babyface (musician)
Songs written by Darnell Bristol